The Low Life is a 1995 American film starring Rory Cochrane and directed and co-written by George Hickenlooper.

Plot
A Yale graduate, with dreams of becoming a writer, moves to Hollywood and struggles with low-paying jobs, poverty, romance and slacker friends.

Cast
Rory Cochrane as John
Sean Astin as Andrew
Kyra Sedgwick as Bevan
Renée Zellweger as Poet
J. T. Walsh as Mike Sr.
Ron Livingston as Chad
James LeGros as Mike, Jr.
Michael Massee as Bartender

References

External links
 
 
 

1995 films
1995 drama films
Films directed by George Hickenlooper
American drama films
1995 directorial debut films
1990s English-language films
1990s American films